Zbigniew Grzegorz Hoffmann (Polish pronunciation: [zbʲ'igɲɛf gʐ'ɛgɔʂ x'ɔffmann]; (born 5 July 1963 in Poznań) is a former Polish politician who was a Voivode of Kuyavian-Pomeranian Voivodeship (2006–2009) and a Vice-Voivode of Greater Poland Voivodeship (2006).

Between 1992 and 2000 he working in Greater Poland Voivodeship Office, and since 1997 as an assistant of Voivode. Between 2000 and 2006 he working for President (Mayor) of Poznań City. In 2006 he was a Vice-Voivode of Greater Poland Voivodeship.

On 7 November 2006 he was nominated as Voivode of Kuyavian-Pomeranian Voivodeship. He was a Voivode until 29 November 2007.

See also
 Kuyavian-Pomeranian Voivodeship
 Greater Poland Voivodeship

References

External links
 Kuyavian-Pomeranian Voivodeship Office website 

1963 births
Living people
Politicians from Poznań
Voivodes of Kuyavian-Pomeranian Voivodeship
Members of the Polish Sejm 2019–2023
Adam Mickiewicz University in Poznań alumni